Sébastien Gondouin (born 15 March 1976 in Créteil) is a retired French football  defender.

External links

1976 births
Living people
French footballers
Association football defenders
Ligue 2 players
Championnat National players
US Créteil-Lusitanos players
Stade de Reims players
Tours FC players